Four Mile is an unincorporated community in Custer County, South Dakota, United States, located four miles west of Custer at the junction of U.S. Route 16 and Pleasant Valley Road (County Highway 715).

Named because of the distance from Custer on the original Sidney Black Hills Stage Road, Four Mile today is a small bedroom community for Custer, with a single tourist attraction (the Four Mile Old West Town Museum), a log-cabin manufacturer, a small mobile home court, and several other residences.

External links
 University of Nebraska–Lincoln: Sidney Black Hills Trail Summary

References

Unincorporated communities in Custer County, South Dakota
Black Hills
Unincorporated communities in South Dakota